Blaine is an unincorporated community in Boone County, Illinois, United States. Blaine is northwest of Capron and north-northeast of Poplar Grove.

References

Unincorporated communities in Boone County, Illinois
Unincorporated communities in Illinois